Mohamed Chaouch (born December 12, 1966 in Aklim) is a former Moroccan footballer.

Club career
He played a season for FC Metz and for OGC Nice from 1993 to 1997.

International career
Chaouch played several games for Morocco and has represented his country in 9 FIFA World Cup qualification matches and played at the 1994 FIFA World Cup, scoring a goal against Saudi Arabia.

Honours

Club
OGC Nice
 Coupe de France: 1997

References

External links
 
 

1966 births
Living people
People from Berkane
Moroccan footballers
Morocco international footballers
1992 African Cup of Nations players
1994 FIFA World Cup players
Kawkab Marrakech players
AS Saint-Étienne players
FC Istres players
FC Metz players
OGC Nice players
Stade Lavallois players
APOEL FC players
Botola players
Ligue 1 players
Ligue 2 players
Cypriot First Division players
Moroccan expatriate footballers
Expatriate footballers in France
Moroccan expatriate sportspeople in France
Expatriate footballers in Cyprus
Association football forwards
Moroccan expatriate sportspeople in Cyprus